A list of films produced in the Cinema of Austria in the 1950s ordered by year of release. For an alphabetical list of articles on Austrian films see :Category:Austrian films.

1950

1951

1952

1953

1954

1955

1956

1957

1958

1959

External links
 Austrian film at the Internet Movie Database
http://www.austrianfilm.com/

1950s
Austria
Films

de:Liste österreichischer Filme